Multipolar or multipolarity can refer to: 
 Polarity (international relations)
 Multipolar neuron

See also
 Tripolar (disambiguation)